Fogars de la Selva is a municipality in the comarca of the Selva in Catalonia, Spain. It is situated to the north of the Montnegre range, and is linked to Tordera by a local road. The village used to be called Fogars de Tordera, and is the only municipality in the Selva to be part of the province of Barcelona rather than the province of Girona.

Demography

References

 Panareda Clopés, Josep Maria; Rios Calvet, Jaume; Rabella Vives, Josep Maria (1989). Guia de Catalunya, Barcelona: Caixa de Catalunya.  (Spanish).  (Catalan).

External links 
  
 Government data pages 

Municipalities in the Province of Barcelona
Municipalities in Selva